Soul Journey is the fourth studio album by American singer-songwriter Gillian Welch. It was released on June 9, 2003 by Acony Records. As with all of her previous releases, it is a collaboration with David Rawlings.

Background 
The album was something of a departure from previous albums by Welch and Rawlings in terms of instrumentation, including a larger band and instruments like drums and an electric bass. Welch has described the album as "more spontaneous" than some of her previous works.

Reception 
Soul Journey received generally favorable reviews. 

Several outlets, including Mojo called it "perfect", with reviewers praising the wistful tone and instrumentation of the album. The Guardian said of her work "[Welch] strips country back to its spiritual and storytelling roots... Welch has refined her bare and beautiful songs and on Soul Journey embraces the blues. Loss and loneliness are her closest friends"

Upon the vinyl re-release in 2018 Relix said the album contained "some of their most indelible songs... Soul Journey makes it equally hard to tell where the past ended and the present began, or remember why anybody ever thought there was a difference."

However, some have expressed disappointment in the album. Pitchfork described it as "a tad raptureless" and others were displeased with the fuller, multi-instrument sound. Welch has said in response that "on some level, it should be a departure from other albums... Everything's not supposed to sound the same, you want it to reflect change and growth."

Track listing

Credits 
 acoustic guitar - Mark Ambrose
 bass - Matt Andrews (on "Lowlands"), Jim Boquist
 Dobro - Greg Leisz
 fiddle - Ketcham Secor
 everything else - Gillian Welch, David Rawlings

Charts

References

External links

2003 albums
Gillian Welch albums